The term Photian Council or Photian Synod may refer to:

 Council of Constantinople (859), confirmed election and consecration of Patriarch Photios 
 Council of Constantinople (861), second confirmation of election and consecration of Patriarch Photios 
 Council of Constantinople (867), third confirmation of election and consecration of Patriarch Photios 
 Council of Constantinople (879-880), rehabilitation of Patriarch Photios

See also
 Council of Constantinople (disambiguation)
 Photios I of Constantinople